Francisco Álvarez may refer to:

Arts and Entertainment
Francisco Álvarez (actor) (1892–1960), Argentine actor
Francisco C. Álvarez (1903–1963), Filipino actor and playwright

Politics
Francisco Álvares (c. 1465–1536/41), Portuguese missionary and explorer
Francisco Álvarez-Cascos (born 1947), Spanish civil engineer and politician

Sportspeople
Francisco Álvarez (beach volleyball) (born 1969), Cuban beach volleyball player
Francisco Álvarez (footballer, born 1982), Salvadoran footballer
Francisco Álvarez (footballer, born 2000), Argentine defender for San Martín de San Juan
Francisco Álvarez (baseball) (born 2001), Venezuelan baseball player

Other uses
Francisco Álvarez Martínez (1925–2022), cardinal in the Roman Catholic Church
General Francisco Álvarez, a town in the Canendiyú department of Paraguay